The Great Sacandaga Lake (formerly the Sacandaga Reservoir) is a large lake situated in the Adirondack Park in northern New York in the United States. The word Sacandaga means "Land of the Waving Grass" in the local native language. The lake is located in the northern parts of Fulton County and Saratoga County near the southern border of the Adirondack Park. A small portion also extends northward into southern Hamilton County. The broader, south end of the lake is northeast of the City of Johnstown and the City of Gloversville.
Great Sacandaga Lake is a reservoir created by damming the Sacandaga River. The primary purpose for the creation of the reservoir was to control flooding on the Hudson River and the Sacandaga River, floods which had a historically significant impact on the surrounding communities.

History

Damming the Sacandaga River had been proposed repeatedly throughout the late 19th century. Only after several large floods impacted downstream communities, such as the city of Albany, was there a serious and concerted effort by the state to explore flood control. A public benefit corporation was established to study the feasibility of the dam and later adopted a resolution proposing the dam in 1924. Construction began in the 1920s and completed in March 1930, at a cost of $12 million.  The dam was constructed at Conklingville in the Town of Day, Saratoga County. 4 covered bridges and a steel railroad bridge were removed or destroyed. A new  bridge consisting of 21 steel spans was constructed at Batchellerville.
This 1930 bridge was replaced in 2012.

Land speculation flourished as the plan to control the river and flood a large expanse of land leaked out. Many people chose to remove houses and buildings to new sites outside of the flood zone. Many isolated farms were flooded as well as all or part of ten communities (Batchellerville, Fish House, Osborne Bridge, The Vly, Cranberry Creek, Sacandaga Park, Town of Day, Conklingville, Munsonville and Benedict). 1100 people were forced out of their homes and twenty four cemeteries holding 3,872 graves were moved. Anything left behind as the dam neared completion was burned.

The new body of water was initially called a "reservoir," but in the 1960s it was renamed the Great Sacandaga Lake in an effort to promote tourism to the area. The reservoir is managed by the Hudson River–Black River Regulating District.
Today, the local businesses benefit not only from the flood protection provided by the lake, but also from the tourist attraction and the resulting economy that the lake has created in the area. People not only come from many local cities and towns to visit the lake for recreation, but also from other areas of the state, New England, and New Jersey.  Many local and out-of-state residents are not only visitors, but also come to the lake to stay in their summer camps and second homes. Public access to the lake is via the many public boat launches, public beaches, and campgrounds that are located on the shores of the lake.
 
Although the lake and some lands surrounding it are owned by New York State, no public money is used to manage the reservoir. Approximately 70% of the District's revenues come from lease agreements with electrical power companies who run the hydroelectric turbines in the dam.

Located on the south shore is the David Rayfiel House, listed on the National Register of Historic Places in 2009.

The Northern Pike that is recognized as the North American record fish of that species at 46 lbs. 2 oz (20.9 kg), was caught in the reservoir on September 15, 1940 by Peter Dubuc.

Operation
Hudson River–Black River Regulating District
Location: Lat 43°18'57", long 73°55'39" (North American Datum of 1927), Saratoga County, NY, Hydrologic Unit 02020002, 800 ft upstream from right end of Conklingville Dam on Sacandaga River at Conklingville.
Period of record: January  1930 to current year. Prior to October 1969, published as "Sacandaga Reservoir at Conklingville".
Gage: Water-stage recorder. Datum of gage is NGVD of 1929, adjustment of 1912.

Fishing
Fish species present in the lake are walleye, northern pike, smallmouth bass, rock bass, smelt, brown trout, yellow perch, landlocked salmon, pumpkinseed sunfish, and brown bullhead.

Gallery

See also
List of reservoirs and dams in New York

References

External links

 Hudson River Black River Regulating District
 Waterwatch.usgs.gov: Most recent flow and stage for New York
 Great Sacandaga Lake in the Adirondacks
 Sacandaga.net: The Great Sacandaga Lake

Reservoirs in New York (state)
Protected areas of Fulton County, New York
Protected areas of Hamilton County, New York
Protected areas of Saratoga County, New York
Reservoirs in Fulton County, New York
Reservoirs in Hamilton County, New York
Reservoirs in Saratoga County, New York
Lakes of Fulton County, New York
Lakes of New York (state)
Lakes of Saratoga County, New York